Darjazin is a city in Semnan Province, Iran.

Darjazin may also refer to:
 Darjazin, Hamadan, a village in Hamadan Province
 Qorveh-e Darjazin, a city in Hamadan Province
 Darjazin Rural District, in Semnan Province
 Darjazin-e Olya Rural District, in Hamadan Province
 Darjazin-e Sofla Rural District, in Hamadan Province